Lisunov is a Russian masculine surname, its feminine counterpart is Lisunova. It may refer to
Boris Lisunov (1898–1946), Soviet aerospace engineer
Ekaterina Lisunova (born 1989), Russian water polo player, wife of Sergey
Sergey Lisunov (born 1986), Russian water polo player, husband of Ekaterina
Vladimir Lisunov (1940–2000), Russian nonconformist artist
Lisunov Li-2 Soviet plane

Russian-language surnames